Henry Rutgers (October 7, 1745 – February 17, 1830)  was a United States Revolutionary War hero and philanthropist from New York City. Rutgers University was named after him, and he donated a bond which placed the college on sound financial footing. He also gave a bell that is still in use today.

Early life
Rutgers was born in New York City, in the Province of New York which was then a part of British America.  He was the son of New Netherland colonists Hendrick Rutgers and Catharine (née DePeyster) Rutgers.

His maternal grandparents were Johannes de Peyster, the 23rd Mayor of New York City, and Anna (née Bancker) de Peyster, the sister of Evert Bancker, the 3rd and 12th Mayor of Albany, New York.  His paternal grandparents were Harmanus Rutgers and Rachel (née Meyers) Rutgers, herself a granddaughter of Claes Martenszen van Rosenvelt, the first Roosevelt to arrive in America.  Through his father's sister, he was a first cousin of Samuel Provoost, the first Bishop of the Episcopal Diocese of New York. He was a third cousin twice removed of both U.S. Presidents Theodore Roosevelt and Franklin Delano Roosevelt.

In 1728 Harmanus Rutgers, Jr. purchased a farm near present-day East Broadway and Oliver Streets. Rutgers was a brewer and had a barn on Catherine Street to store the barley he grew. A lane that would later become Cherry Street ran along the southern border. His son Hendrick inherited the property and in 1754 built a new farmhouse farther to the north and nearer the East River. The Rutgers extended their holdings, purchasing water lots. Fill was added to the water on either side at the ends of the larger streets that ran perpendicular to the shore, forming slips or inlets where small boats could dock.

Career
Henry graduated from King's College (now Columbia University) in 1766. Following his graduation, he promptly became an advocate for independence of the American colonies from Great Britain.  He went on to serve as a captain of American forces at the Battle of White Plains, and later as a colonel for the New York militia. During the British occupation of New York, Henry withdrew to Albany. During his absence, the British used the family home as an army hospital.

Colonel Rutgers would continue to play a role in the defense of the young nation after the Revolution, presiding over a meeting held June 24, 1812 to organize American forces in New York in anticipation of a British attack in the ensuing War of 1812.

Politics and public life

In 1783, Colonel Rutgers was elected to the New York State Assembly, where he served in the 7th New York State Legislature.  He also served on the New York Board of Education Regents from 1802 to 1826. He was a Presidential Elector, chosen by the legislature, in 1808, 1816, and 1820.

Rutgers supported the American Colonization Society, arguing against abolitionists that free people of color should be removed from the United States rather than allowed to grow as a population. He was himself a slaveowner, like many of his relatives.

Rutgers continued to expand his holdings, extending his water lots further out into the river. In his later years, Rutgers, a bachelor, devoted much of his fortune to philanthropy. As a landowner with considerable holdings on the island of Manhattan (especially in the vicinity of Chatham Square), he donated land for the use of schools, churches, and charities in the area.  Both Henry Street and Rutgers Street in lower Manhattan are named for him, as well as the Rutgers Presbyterian Church (formerly the Collegiate Presbyterian Church) which was also named for Colonel Rutgers who donated the parcel of land at the corner of Henry Street and Rutgers Street on which the original church was built in 1798.

Colonel Rutgers's most lasting legacy however, is due to his donations to Queen's College in New Brunswick, New Jersey, which at the time was suffering considerable financial difficulties and temporarily closed.  The college had been founded as a seminary for the Reformed Church in America and appealed to Colonel Rutgers, a devout member of the church with a reputation for philanthropy, for aid. Rutgers donated a bond valued at $5000 to reopen the faltering school, and subsequently donated a bronze bell that was hung in the cupola of the Old Queens building which housed the college. In gratitude, and hoping the college would be remembered in the Colonel's will, the trustees renamed it Rutgers College on December 5, 1825. (Colonel Rutgers left nothing to the college upon his death.) The institution later became "Rutgers University," then "Rutgers, The State University of New Jersey".

Death and legacy
Henry Rutgers died in New York City, at the age of 84. Rutgers was initially buried in the Reformed Church on Nassau Street (the same church in which he was baptized). However, as cemeteries in Manhattan were redeveloped during the mid-1800s, the Colonel's body was re-interred several times (first moved in 1858 to the Middle Church in Lafayette Place, on the corner of Nassau Street and Cedar Street in Manhattan, and then, in 1865, interred in Green-Wood Cemetery). For many years, no one remembered where his body had been finally laid to rest, although it was long believed that he was buried in a Dutch Reformed churchyard in Belleville, New Jersey. One road running alongside this New Jersey graveyard is now called Rutgers Street (signed as, but not technically part of, Route 7).

Misplaced by history for over 140 years, Henry Rutgers' final "final resting place" was rediscovered in October 2007 by Civil War research volunteers sifting through burial records of the historical Green-Wood Cemetery. In 1865, Rutgers' body had been finally laid to rest in an unmarked grave (he is interred in Lot 10776, Sec. 28, in an underground vault) within the Dutch Reformed Church's plot at Green-Wood Cemetery in Brooklyn.

The Green-Wood Historic Fund and members of the Rutgers Community honored the Colonel's memory on Flag Day, June 14, 2008 by unveiling a bronze marker at his gravesite. Elsewhere in Green-Wood Cemetery lies the grave of Mabel Smith Douglass, founder and first dean of the New Jersey College for Women (renamed Douglass College in her honor.) Douglass College is part of Rutgers University's New Brunswick campus.

References

External links

 Rutgers University
 Rutgers Presbyterian Church in New York City.
 From the papers of Henry Rutgers
 Famous Dutch Americans

1745 births
1830 deaths
Columbia College (New York) alumni
Rutgers University people
American people of Dutch descent
De Peyster family
Military personnel from New York City
Members of the New York State Assembly
Huguenot participants in the American Revolution
Continental Army officers from New York (state)
Philanthropists from New York (state)
Burials at Green-Wood Cemetery
1808 United States presidential electors
1816 United States presidential electors
1820 United States presidential electors
University and college founders
Roosevelt family
American slave owners